Circuit Les Planques was a  long motor racing road circuit in a triangular shape, located near Albi.

History

Built in 1933 by a group of enthusiasts, the circuit of Albi les Planques quickly became a classic in the racing specialty of cars. This event was ran on a bumpy and narrow road.

After the war, from 1946, the Albi Grand Prix continued to be a non-championship Formula One motor race.

Dario Ambrosini was dead on the 1951 French motorcycle Grand Prix. 

In 1954, the circuit was renamed Circuit Raymond Sommer in homage to the driver who died in 1950 and had enchanted the Albigensians in 1947 in Formula Two.

After the 1955 Le Mans disaster, the track was officially closed as deemed too dangerous. Motor racing was transferred in 1959 to the new purpose-built Circuit d'Albi west of the city, first for Formula Two and then Formula Three.

Description

The start was given on the shorter side of the triangle, in the hamlet of Les planques, near Albi; after a right turn, the circuit winded up to Saint-Antoine and climbed to the village of Saint-Juéry where a hairpin turned the track south and then crossed a railway line followed by a bump. A long straight, Montplaisir, followed by another, the current Route de Millau, led back to the starting line.

In 1934, the first modification was made. To remove the hairpin at the Planques, a  ramp was drawn along the edge which was built, by volunteers, stood on either side as well as a passage under the track which leaded the riders to their pits. The starting line was permanently fixed there. At the end of the grandstand (south of the starting line) was built the timing tower, the only vestige still in place from that time. This new structure allowed the homologation for the registration of the circuit on the international calendar.

The circuit was shortened in 1954 to only  and was called the Raymond Sommer circuit. No more races crossed Saint-Juéry.

Lap records

The official race lap records at the Circuit Les Planques are listed as:

See also
Circuit d'Albi

Notes

References

Grand Prix motorcycle circuits
Albi
Sports venues in Tarn (department)
Sport in Albi